The Women's 100 metres at the 2014 Commonwealth Games, as part of the athletics programme, was held at Hampden Park on 27 and 28 July 2014.

Results

First round

The first round consisted of six heats, with qualification for the first three in each heat, and the six fastest losers overall. Nigeria's Blessing Okagbare was the fastest qualifier from the first round, at 11.20 seconds. After qualifying from the first round, Michelle-Lee Ahye of Trinidad and Tobago announced her withdrawal due to hamstring concerns.

Heat 1

Heat 2

Heat 3

Heat 4

Heat 5

Heat 6

Semifinals

Heat 1

Heat 2

Heat 3

Final

References
General
Women's 100m – Qualification Standings
Specific

Woen's 100 metres
2014
2014 in women's athletics